Nsumbu National Park (also called Sumbu) lies on the western shore of Lake Tanganyika near its southern extremity, in Zambia's Northern Province. It covers about 2000 km² and has some 80 km of lake shore including four bays (Kasaba, Kala, Nkamba and Sumbu), and Nundo Head Peninsula.

Features
There are two active lodges on Lake Tanganyika, Nkamba (an exclusive lodge within the Nsumbu National Park), and Ndole Bay just north of the park.  Kasaba Bay Lodge closed down in 2006.

Sumbu offers game viewing combined with sports fishing on the lake, and a beautiful landscape. The lake shore includes rocky cliffs, the balancing rocks, sandy beaches, and pristine waters, with views to the mountainous eastern shore of the lake. Swimming is discouraged as crocodile and hippo are common. Nkamba Bay Lodge located in the park offers game drives, canoeing, sports fishing, walks, overnight trails and boating safaris.

The park lies mainly in the Central Zambezian Miombo woodlands ecoregion, but also includes patches of the rare and endangered and almost impenetrable Itigi-Sumbu thicket.

The Lufubu River cuts a 300 m deep valley in the south of the park but this is only accessible via rough tracks from Mbala to the south-east.

The park is served by Kasaba Bay Airport.

Recent history
Until the late 1960s Kasaba Bay Lodge was accessible only by air, or boat from Mpulungu, and catered to wealthy and international visitors. The Mporokoso District authorities had a humble guesthouse at Sumbu Bay, reached by a gravel road from Mporokoso. In the early 1970s this road was connected to Kasaba Bay Lodge, and a new lodge was built at Nkamba Bay.

At that time and into the 1970s, Sumbu was considered to be, with South Luangwa and Kafue, one of the best national parks of Zambia, with elephants and lions being common.

Game numbers in the park declined in the 1980s and 1990s due to a lack of management exacerbated by the cutback of the country's domestic airline which used to fly visitors to the park. Its remoteness by road and proximity to war and conflict in the DR Congo, the land border of which is only 25 km to the north, deterred visitors.

Present day
There has been some refurbishment in recent years and game numbers are rising again. Frankfurt Zoological Society Zambian partnered with DNPW in 2017 to form the Nsumbu Tanganyika Conservation Project, and managed by Craig Zytkow, has grown considerably.

Accessing the park is best done via the Kasama - Mporokoso - Nsumbu road. The road is tarred up to Mporokoso (170 km) and gravel thereafter (another 170 km). The gravel part is currently bring worked upon (early 2020) and is on the improve.

The Tanganyika Angling Challenge place at Nkamba and Ndole Bay Lodges in March or April every year.

Fauna

Mammals
Nile crocodile, hippopotamus, bushbuck, warthog, puku, roan antelope, sable antelope, eland, hartebeest, African buffalo, plains zebra, spotted hyena, side-striped jackal, serval, impala, waterbuck, reedbuck, bush elephant (occasionally), East-African lion (occasionally), leopard (occasionally), blue duiker (rare), sitatunga (rare)

Birds
Flamingo, African skimmer, spoonbill, whiskered tern, stork, duck, heron, gray-headed gull, lesser black-backed gull, white-winged black tern, fish eagle, palm-nut vulture (occasionally), Pel's fishing owl (occasionally)

Fish
Nile perch, goliath tigerfish, vundu catfish, lake salmon, yellow belly or 'nkupi', golden perch (occasionally)

See also
 Wildlife of Zambia

References

National parks of Zambia
Lake Tanganyika
Central Zambezian miombo woodlands
Geography of Northern Province, Zambia
Tourist attractions in Northern Province, Zambia
Important Bird Areas of Zambia